The women's road race cycling events at the 2012 Summer Paralympics took place on 6–8 September at Brands Hatch.

Classification
Cyclists are given a classification depending on the type and extent of their disability. The classification system allows cyclists to compete against others with a similar level of function. The class number indicates the severity of impairment with "1" being most impaired.

Cycling classes are:
B: Blind and visually impaired cyclists use a tandem bicycle with a sighted pilot on the front.
H 1–4: Cyclists with an impairment that affects their legs use a handcycle.
T 1–2: Cyclists with an impairment that affects their balance use a tricycle.
C 1–5: Cyclists with an impairment that affects their legs, arms and/or trunk, but are capable of using a standard bicycle.

B

H1–3

H4

C1–3

C4–5

References 

Women's road race
2012 in women's road cycling